The 1926 Paris–Tours was the 21st edition of the Paris–Tours cycle race and was held on 2 May 1926. The race started in Paris and finished in Tours. The race was won by Heiri Suter.

General classification

References

1926 in French sport
1926
May 1926 sports events